The North American Taiwan Studies Association (NATSA) is an American 501(c)(3) nonprofit academic organization established in 1994. It is operated by overseas Taiwanese students, North American doctoral students, and recent graduates who are interested in Taiwan studies. The NATSA annual conferences are the largest academic events on Taiwan Studies in North America. The NATSA conferences not only provide scholars and students of Taiwan Studies a regular forum to meet and exchange intellectual ideas, but also allow researchers on East Asia and beyond to receive dynamic feedback and broaden their academic horizons.

Early history 
When NATSA was founded, it was known as the North American Taiwan Studies Conference and was located on the web at www.natsc.org until August 2006 when it switched to its current address.

Conferences

NATSA-initiated projects

NATSA Professional Development Webinar Series 
The NATSA professional development webinars started in August, 2017. The objectives of the series are:

 Enhance members’ professional skills
 Strengthen professional networks of members in the academia and the industry
 Promote NATSA to non-members

NATSA Podcast 

https://www.na-tsa.org/basic-01

2019-2021
Season 1: Chats with Scholars

2021-2022
Season 2: 研究生轉運站

Taiwan Studies Syllabus Project 
https://www.na-tsa.org/taiwan-syllabus-project

Experts in Taiwan Studies crowd-sourcing project 
https://www.na-tsa.org/experts-in-taiwan-studies

Taiwan Studies Workshop Fund 
https://www.na-tsa.org/taiwan-studies-fund

The Future of Taiwan Studies in a Post COVID world  
https://www.na-tsa.org/future-of-taiwan-studies-post-covid

 Ep 1. COVID-19 and Governance Social and Global Solidarity
 Ep 2. How does the Hong Kong Security Law and "Decoupling from China" Impact Taiwan
 Ep 3. The Impact of the COVID-19 Crisis on Taiwan's External Relations: Views from Japan
 Ep 4. From Taiwanese-language Films to the Future of Taiwan Cinema

References

Educational charities based in the United States
Professional associations based in the United States
Taiwanese studies